The Chevrolet Express is a concept car created in 1987 by Chevrolet. The car featured a roof which opened to allow entry, ran on a gas turbine engine, was capable of 150 miles per hour, and was made of carbon fiber. The car had drive-by-wire controls, instrumentation and three dash-mounted screens, and cameras replacing mirrors.

The car is also seen in Back to the Future Part II upon Marty's arrival in the year 2015.

References

External links
 Chevrolet Express

Express